Oscinisoma is a genus of frit flies in the family Chloropidae. There are about eight described species in Oscinisoma.

Species
These eight species belong to the genus Oscinisoma:
 Oscinisoma alienum (Becker, 1912) i c g b
 Oscinisoma catharinensis (Enderlein, 1911) c g
 Oscinisoma cognatum (Meigen, 1830) c g
 Oscinisoma germanicum (Duda, 1932) c g
 Oscinisoma gilvipes (Loew, 1858) c g
 Oscinisoma longipalpus (Enderlein, 1913) c g
 Oscinisoma rectum (Becker, 1911) c g
 Oscinisoma ussuriense Nartshuk, 1973 c g
Data sources: i = ITIS, c = Catalogue of Life, g = GBIF, b = Bugguide.net

References

Further reading

External links

 

Oscinellinae